Louis Anthony Agnello (born January 30, 1960) is an American morality writer known by his penname Cousin Vinny. He published the novel The Devil's Glove. The San Jose Mercury Newspaper described his life as an "eye-popping head swivel."

Biography

Early life

Born in Flushing, New York, Agnello was a student at Western Connecticut State University when he became a stripper. He earned a bachelor's degree in English in 1992.
 
Agnello worked as a stripper in New York to work his way through college. He later operated World Famous Cousin Vinny's Gorgeous Strippers. In 1986, he appeared on "Regis and Kathie Lee Live." At about the same time, Agnello dabbled in acting, appearing on the soap operas "Guiding Light," "Ryan's Hope" and "One Life to Live." Later he would be a featured guest on The O'Reilly Factor, Hannity and Colmes, and Judith Regan Tonight among others. 
He was news. As a stripper, his fame was so out there, he was a guest on Regis and Kathie Lee Live. He was driven by media attention. But something snapped in him after he was shot in 2008. One bullet hit Agnello's left upper thigh and another was blocked by the wad of credit cards he was carrying in his pocket. At the time, he was wearing $100,000 worth of jewelry and police determined the shooting was a botched robbery.  He realized he was mortal. In 2011, he returned to a novel that he had begun writing 20 years earlier: "The Devil's Glove." Published by the Christian-based Tate Publishing group, October 2013, "The Devil's Glove" is the fictional tale of minor league baseball player Billy Green, who has lost his way after years of disappointment and summons a "mysterious stranger who promises to help him cheat his way on to the big stage of major league baseball if he lives up to the terms of a nefarious agreement." On the surface, the 371-page soft cover novel sounds a bit like "Damn Yankees" and/or a retelling of the classic German tale of "Faust." And it definitely is a precautionary tale about the temptations of evil. But the reviews are coming in, strong and sturdy for a good read. It has been called a "spiritual thriller," a "timeless tale that will renew your faith in God and human nature." Barnes & Noble writes that "The Devil's Glove" is "mostly baseball, partly supernatural and inspirational. (It is) a book that defies easy description by an author who defies description." 
The book has garnered national attention and led to a book-signing tour with stops at multiple U.S. cities.  In February 2014, Agnello kicked off a long U.S. book signing tour. He's been in Connecticut, New York, New Jersey, Maryland, South Carolina, Georgia, Florida, Mississippi, Louisiana, Alabama, Tennessee, Kansas, Oklahoma, Missouri, and the list just keeps traveling. Right before his two book signings in Pacifica, he'll have made California stops in Bakersfield, Palmdale, Visalia, Fresno, Turlock, Tracy, Stockton and San Jose. There will be more California stops before he heads home for a bit to take a holiday break. Agnello notes the book is "bigger than him" and he is more of a "messenger" than an author. Judging by the long, long line of people of all ages that look out from the author's Facebook page, each looking genuinely pleased as they hold a "Devil's Glove" copy and pose with Agnello, this messenger might really be onto something.

Books
He released the book The Devil's Glove, a Christian morality tale, in 2014.

Agnello recently completed the sequel to The Devil's Glove called The Revenge of the Manager.

In 2014 Adweek opened their feature on "Cousin Vinny" by saying, "If you've forgotten or never read about Agnello's incredible life story, do yourself a favor and take the time to digest the details of Savannah Morning News entertainment writer Linda Sickler's profile piece."

References

External links
Former stripper king of New York-writes-inspirational-book
Interview on Youtube 
Interview on Youtube
Devil's Glove interview Wichita KS. 

1960 births
American male writers
Living people